Bison valley is a village in Udumbanchola Taluk in the Idukki district of the southwestern Indian state of Kerala. Bison valley is situated at around 914 metres (3000 ft) above mean sea level, in the Western Ghats range of mountains.

Etymology 
The name Bison valley is believed to tell the history of the place, Where the kings and officers of east India company came for hunting bison during their vacations in Munnar.

Demographics
As of 2011 Census, Baisonvally had a population of 12,653 among which 6,332 are males and 6,321 are females. In Bisonvalley, 9.9% of the population was under 6 years of age. Bisonvalley had an average literacy of 93% higher than the national average of 74% and lower than state average of 94%.

Transportation

Road

Railway
The nearest major railway stations are at Ernakulam and Aluva (approximately 140 kilometres by road). The Nearest Functioning Railway station is at Udumalaipettai.

Airport
The nearest airport is Cochin International Airport, which is 110 kilometers away. The Coimbatore and Madurai airports is 155 km from Bison valley.

References 

Villages in Idukki district